Francis Fulton-Smith (born 25 April 1966) is a British-German television actor.

Life
Fulton-Smith was born in Munich, West Germany, the son of a German mother and an English father.
After graduating school he trained as an actor at the Otto-Falckenberg-Schule in Munich . Since 1991 he has performed in theater and has appeared in more than 150 films, mostly as a leading man. In 2014 he won the “BAMBI” and the “German Acting Award” for this part. In 2016 he played Hermann Goering in “The Good Goering.”

He has two daughters (born 2009, 2012) living in Munich. In 2011 he founded a production company called Little Door Films and produced film “Murder in Athens” for the German broadcaster ARD. After winning the Special Jury Distinction Award and the Audience Award at EIFF in Canada, his short film “Someone” was qualified for an Academy Award.

Acting career

Television, Movies

Theatre
 1988–1990: Münchner Kammerspiele
 1990–1993: Württembergische Landesbühne Esslingen
 1993–1995: Staatstheater Braunschweig
 1995/1996: Deutsches Schauspielhaus Hamburg
 2012/2013: Jedermann im Berliner Dom

References

External links

Official Homepage

 Francis Fulton-Smith at the Agentur Fischer & Partner

1966 births
Living people
Male actors from Munich
German male television actors
20th-century German male actors
21st-century German male actors
German people of English descent